The 1984 WAFL season was the 100th season of the West Australian Football League and its various incarnations.

It saw Swan Districts record their sixth WAFL premiership, and its third in a row, after a slow start that had it win only half its games in the first fourteen rounds. East Fremantle returned to the Grand Final after four disappointing seasons with only 28 wins from 85 games. After an unsuccessful decade, Subiaco recalled former coach Haydn Bunton, Jr., and despite not improving their position in the seniors, were generally considered to have made major improvement with five more victories and a young reserves side winning the club's first premiership in any grade since their 1974 colts win. South Fremantle, who began with a number of spectacular performances fell away from second place with five losses in their final six games. The Tigers were last for five weeks early in the season and second from bottom before a winning streak of five games pushed them to third.

Off the field, the WAFL refused requests to allow telecasts of VFL matches in rural WA by the Golden West network.

Home-and-away season

Round 1
|

Round 2
|

Round 3
|

Round 4 (Easter weekend)
|

Round 5
|

Round 6
|

Round 7
|

Round 8
|

Round 9
|

Round 10 (Foundation Day)
|

Round 11
|

Round 12
|

Round 13
|

Round 14
|

Round 15
|

Round 16
|

Round 17
|

Round 18
|

Round 19
|

Round 20
|

Round 21
|

Ladder

Finals

First semi-final

Second semi-final

Preliminary final

Grand Final

References

External links
Official WAFL website
WAFL Season 1984

West Australian Football League seasons
WAFL